The Clay Mathematics Institute (CMI) is a private, non-profit foundation dedicated to increasing and disseminating mathematical knowledge. Formerly based in Peterborough, New Hampshire, the corporate address is now in Denver, Colorado. CMI's scientific activities are managed from the President's office in Oxford, United Kingdom. It gives out various awards and sponsorships to promising mathematicians. The institute was founded in 1998 through the sponsorship of Boston businessman Landon T. Clay. Harvard mathematician Arthur Jaffe was the first president of CMI.

While the institute is best known for its Millennium Prize Problems, it carries out a wide range of activities, including a postdoctoral program (ten Clay Research Fellows are supported currently), conferences, workshops, and summer schools.

Governance
The institute is run according to a standard structure comprising a scientific advisory committee that decides on grant-awarding and research proposals, and a board of directors that oversees and approves the committee's decisions. , the board is made up of members of the Clay family, whereas the advisory committee is composed of Simon Donaldson, Michael Hopkins, Andrei Okounkov, Gigliola Staffilani and Andrew Wiles. Martin R. Bridson is the current president of CMI.

Millennium Prize Problems

The institute is best known for establishing the Millennium Prize Problems on May 24, 2000. These seven problems are considered by CMI to be "important classic questions that have resisted solution over the years." For each problem, the first person to solve it will be awarded $1,000,000 by the CMI. In announcing the prize, CMI drew a parallel to Hilbert's problems, which were proposed in 1900, and had a substantial impact on 20th century mathematics. Of the initial 23 Hilbert problems, most of which have been solved, only the Riemann hypothesis (formulated in 1859) is included in the seven Millennium Prize Problems.

For each problem, the Institute had a professional mathematician write up an official statement of the problem, which will be the main standard by which a given solution will be measured against. The seven problems are:

 P versus NP
 The Hodge conjecture
 The Poincaré conjecture—solved, by Grigori Perelman
 The Riemann hypothesis
 Yang–Mills existence and mass gap
 Navier–Stokes existence and smoothness
 The Birch and Swinnerton-Dyer conjecture

Some of the mathematicians who were involved in the selection and presentation of the seven problems were Michael Atiyah, Enrico Bombieri, Alain Connes, Pierre Deligne, Charles Fefferman, John Milnor, David Mumford, Andrew Wiles, and Edward Witten.

Other awards

The Clay Research Award

In recognition of major breakthroughs in mathematical research, the institute has an annual prize — the Clay Research Award. Its recipients to date are Ian Agol, Manindra Agrawal, Yves Benoist, Manjul Bhargava, Tristan Buckmaster, Danny Calegari, Alain Connes, Nils Dencker, Alex Eskin, David Gabai, Ben Green, Mark Gross, Larry Guth, Christopher Hacon, Richard S. Hamilton, Michael Harris, Philip Isett, Jeremy Kahn, Nets Katz, Laurent Lafforgue, Gérard Laumon, Aleksandr Logunov, Eugenia Malinnikova, Vladimir Markovic, James McKernan, Jason Miller, Maryam Mirzakhani, Ngô Bảo Châu, Rahul Pandharipande, Jonathan Pila, Jean-François Quint, Peter Scholze, Oded Schramm, Scott Sheffield, Bernd Siebert, Stanislav Smirnov, Terence Tao, Clifford Taubes, Richard Taylor, Maryna Viazovska, Vlad Vicol, Claire Voisin, Jean-Loup Waldspurger, Andrew Wiles, Geordie Williamson, Edward Witten and Wei Zhang.

Other activities
Besides the Millennium Prize Problems, the Clay Mathematics Institute supports mathematics via the awarding of research fellowships (which range from two to five years, and are aimed at younger mathematicians), as well as shorter-term scholarships for programs, individual research, and book writing. The institute also has a yearly Clay Research Award, recognizing major breakthroughs in mathematical research. Finally, the institute organizes a number of summer schools, conferences, workshops, public lectures, and outreach activities aimed primarily at junior mathematicians (from the high school to postdoctoral level). CMI publications are available in PDF form at most six months after they appear in print.

References

Keith J. Devlin, The Millennium Problems: The Seven Greatest Unsolved Mathematical Puzzles of Our Time, Basic Books (October, 2002), .

External links
 Official website
 The Millennium Grand Challenge in Mathematics
 Millennium Problems
 Clay Mathematics Institute Online Library

Organizations established in 1998
Mathematical institutes
Research institutes in Colorado
1998 establishments in New Hampshire
Organizations based in Denver